William Blacker (29 September 1853 – 21 November 1907) was an Irish cricketer. He played 32 first-class matches for Cambridge University Cricket Club between 1873 and 1876.

He was educated at Harrow School.

See also
 List of Cambridge University Cricket Club players

References

External links
 

1853 births
1907 deaths
Irish cricketers
People educated at Harrow School
Cambridge University cricketers
Cricketers from Dublin (city)
Marylebone Cricket Club cricketers
Gentlemen of the South cricketers
Non-international England cricketers